Alahakoon is a surname. Notable people with the surname include:

 Jayatissa Alahakoon (1932–2019), Sri Lankan music director and composer
 Prasanna Alahakoon, Sri Lankan Navy officer and engineer
 Sujatha Alahakoon (born 1959), Sri Lankan politician